Gabriel Gadison Ajedra Aridru is a Ugandan civil engineer and politician. He was the  State Minister of Finance for General Duties in  the Cabinet of Uganda, from 6 June 2016 until 3 May 2021. Prior to that, from 12 August 2012, until 6 June 2016, he served as the State Minister of Finance for Investments. In the cabinet reshuffle of 24 May 2013, and that of 1 March 2015, he retained his cabinet post. He also served as the elected member of parliament for Arua Municipality, Arua District, until May 2021.

Background and education
He was born in Arua District on 30 August 1962. He studied at Makerere University, graduating in 1989 with the degree of Bachelor of Science in Civil Engineering. He pursued further studies in Canada, obtaining the degree of Master of Science in Civil Engineering from the University of New Brunswick in 1992. In 1997, he was awarded the degree of Doctor of Philosophy in Civil Engineering.

Career
Following his postgraduate studies in Canada, he was appointed Lecturer in Civil Engineering at the University of Botswana. He later taught, as a lecturer in Civil Engineering at the Development University of Bahamas. Then he returned to Uganda and worked as an engineer for the National Water and Sewerage Corporation. For a period of time, he served as the Chief Project Coordinator and Advisor on Infrastructure for the Government of Botswana. In 2011, he successfully contested for the parliamentary seat of Arua Municipality, on the National Resistance Movement political party ticket. In August 2012, he was appointed State Minister of Finance, responsible for Investments. On 6 June 2016, he was named as State Minister for Investments.

Other considerations
Dr. Aridru was previously married to Josephine Aridru from Arua. He is a follower of the Anglican faith. He is now married to Elizabeth Kamuhanda of Kabale.

See also
 Parliament of Uganda
 Cabinet of Uganda
 Government of Uganda

References

External links
 Website of the Parliament of Uganda
 Full List of Cabinet Ministers May 2011

1962 births
Living people
Lugbara people
People educated at St. Joseph's College Ombaci
Ugandan civil engineers
People from West Nile sub-region
People from Northern Region, Uganda
21st-century Ugandan politicians
Academic staff of the University of Botswana
People educated at Namilyango College
Members of the Parliament of Uganda
People from Arua District
University of New Brunswick alumni
Government ministers of Uganda
National Resistance Movement politicians
Makerere University alumni